Austrolestes is a genus of medium to large-sized damselflies in the family Lestidae.
Austrolestes damselflies sit with their wings folded completely back.
Males are usually bright blue and black, the females duller. Members of this genus are found in Australia, New Zealand and South Pacific islands.

Species 
The genus Austrolestes includes the following species:

Etymology
The genus name Austrolestes is derived from the latin word auster meaning south wind, hence south; and the damselfly genus Lestes, which is from the Greek word λῃστής meaning a robber.
In 1913, Robin Tillyard described the genus Austrolestes as having characters similar to the very large genus Lestes, which, unlike Austrolestes, sit with their wings outspread.

References

Lestidae
Zygoptera genera
Odonata of Oceania
Odonata of Australia
Odonata of New Zealand
Taxa named by Robert John Tillyard
Insects described in 1913
Damselflies